Bangalee is a suburb of Nowra in the City of Shoalhaven in New South Wales, Australia. It lies north of the Shoalhaven about 7 km to the northwest of Nowra.

Bangalee is an Aboriginal name meaning "sandy beach" and was the original name for the Shoalhaven River. Bangalee was also a name "used by Cliff Richards for his pleasure grounds which were situated near where [Bengalee] Creek runs into the Shoalhaven River".

References

City of Shoalhaven